Joy to the World: Their Greatest Hits is the twelfth album by American rock band, Three Dog Night, released in 1974.

Release 
Joy to the World is the follow-up compilation to Golden Bisquits, consisting of eleven (out of twelve) charted hits from the group's previous four studio albums (the top 20 hit "Pieces of April" was left off for reasons unknown), two charted hits that already appeared on their first greatest hits compilation ("One" and "One Man Band"), and non-charting B-side "I'd Be So Happy". In 1981 the album was reissued on MCA Records with issue number MCA-37120.

Critical reception 

Reviewing in Christgau's Record Guide: Rock Albums of the Seventies (1981), Robert Christgau wrote: "Things seem to be winding up for the Kings of Oversing, but this fourteen-song compilation demonstrates that the singles, unlike the albums, didn't diminish much. It also suggests that though they're praised when at all for translating weirdos like Nilsson and Newman into AM, they also deserve credit for preserving the odd goody (two apiece) by the likes of Paul Williams and Hoyt Axton. Only Lighthouse keeper Skip Prokop proves beyond help."

Track listing

Personnel
Mike Allsup - banjo, guitar
Jimmy Greenspoon - keyboards
Danny Hutton - vocals
Skip Konte - keyboards on "The Show Must Go On", "Sure As I'm Sittin' Here", "Play Something Sweet" and "I'd Be So Happy"
Chuck Negron - vocals
Joe Schermie - bass guitar except as indicated below
Jack Ryland - bass guitar on "Shambala", "Let Me Serenade You", "The Show Must Go On", "Sure As I'm Sittin' Here", "Play Something Sweet" and "I'd Be So Happy"
Floyd Sneed - drums, percussion
Cory Wells - vocals

Production
Producers: Jimmy Ienner, Gabriel Mekler, Richard Podolor

Charts
Album - Billboard (United States)

Certifications

References

1974 greatest hits albums
Three Dog Night compilation albums
Albums produced by Jimmy Ienner
Albums produced by Richard Podolor
Albums produced by Gabriel Mekler
Dunhill Records compilation albums